Doug Scott (born October 2, 1955) is a former Canadian football defensive lineman in the Canadian Football League who played for the Montreal Alouettes/Concordes. He played college football for the Boise State Broncos.

References

1955 births
Living people
American football defensive linemen
Canadian football defensive linemen
Montreal Alouettes players
Montreal Concordes players
Boise State Broncos football players
Players of Canadian football from Quebec